Stackhousia viminea the Slender Stackhousia is a common small Australian plant. It grows to 70 cm tall. The habitat is heathland, pastures, eucalyptus woodland and forest, usually in moist areas. It features attractive yellowish/red flowers. The specific epithet viminea refers to the slender stems. The genus is named after the botanist and artist, John Stackhouse.

First collected at Sydney by John White. And described a few years later by the prolific English botanist James Smith.

References

Stackhousia
Flora of South Australia
Flora of Tasmania
Flora of Victoria (Australia)
Flora of Western Australia
Flora of New South Wales
Flora of the Northern Territory